{{speciesbox
| name = White-chinned prinia
| image = White-chinned Prinia - Kakamega Kenya 06 1467 (17320726175).jpg
| image_caption = At Kakamega, Kenya
| status = LC
| status_system = IUCN3.1
| status_ref= 
| genus = Schistolais
| species = leucopogon
| authority = (Cabanis, 1875)
| subdivision_ranks = Subspecies
| subdivision =
S. l. leucopogonS. l. reichenowi| synonyms = 
}}

The white-chinned prinia (Schistolais leucopogon), also known as the white-chinned warbler, is a species of bird in the family Cisticolidae.

The white-chinned prinia was described by the German ornithologist Jean Cabanis in 1875 and given the binomial name Drymoeca leucopogon. The specific epithet leucopogon is from the Ancient Greek leukos for "white" and pōgōn'', "beard".

Distribution and habitat
It is found in Angola, Burundi, Cameroon, Central African Republic, Republic of the Congo, Democratic Republic of the Congo, Equatorial Guinea, Gabon, Kenya, Nigeria, Rwanda, South Sudan, Tanzania, Uganda, and Zambia.  Its natural habitats are subtropical or tropical dry forest, subtropical or tropical moist lowland forest, subtropical or tropical moist montane forest, and subtropical or tropical moist shrubland.

References

white-chinned prinia
Birds of Central Africa
white-chinned prinia
Taxonomy articles created by Polbot